The 2004–05 season was the 63rd season in the existence of FC Nantes and the club's 43rd consecutive season in the top flight of French football. In addition to the domestic league, Nantes participated in this season's edition of the Coupe de France and the Coupe de la Ligue. The season covered the period from 1 July 2004 to 30 June 2005.

Transfers

In

Out

Competitions

Overall record

Ligue 1

League table

Results summary

Results by round

Matches

Source:

Coupe de France

Coupe de la Ligue

Statistics

Goalscorers

References

FC Nantes seasons
Nantes